The 2017 UConn Huskies football team represented the University of Connecticut during the 2017 NCAA Division I FBS football season as a member of the East Division of the American Athletic Conference. They played their home games at Rentschler Field. They were led by head coach Randy Edsall in his first year of his second stint and thirteenth year overall. They finished the season 3–9, 2–6 in AAC play to finish in a three-way tie for fourth place in the East Division.

Schedule

The game between UConn and USF on originally scheduled for September 9 at noon before being moved to 10:30 a.m. and ultimately was cancelled due to Hurricane Irma. It has been rescheduled to November 4 (replacing the ECU game) and UConn will now host ECU Sunday, September 24 (replacing an open date).

Schedule Source:

Roster

Game summaries

Holy Cross

at Virginia

East Carolina

at SMU

Memphis

at Temple

Tulsa

Missouri

South Florida

at UCF

vs Boston College

at Cincinnati

Players in the 2018 NFL Draft

References

UConn
UConn Huskies football seasons
UConn Huskies football